The 1999 North Devon District Council election took place on 6 May 1999 to elect members of North Devon District Council in Devon, England. The whole council was up for election and the Liberal Democrats stayed in overall control of the council.

Election result
Overall turnout in the election was 37.77%.

2 independent and 1 Liberal Democrat candidates were unopposed.

Ward results

References

1999 English local elections
1999
1990s in Devon